Jesús Jiménez Barbero (born 1960, in Madrid) is a Spanish scientist who has contributed to the advance of glycoscience by unraveling the conformational properties of carbohydrates and analogues and the molecular basis of their interactions with proteins, using a multidisciplinary approach that employs carbohydrate synthesis, molecular biology, molecular modelling and Nuclear Magnetic Resonance (NMR) spectroscopy.

Academic career
He studied chemistry at the Universidad Autonoma de Madrid where he obtained his PhD in 1987. He continued post-doctoral research at National Institute for Medical Research at Mill Hill. From 1990 to 1992, he was visiting scientist at Carnegie Mellon University (Pittsburgh, USA).
He returned to Spain, rising to Senior Research Scientist of CSIC at the Institute of Organic Chemistry (1996) and Research Professor of CSIC at the Centre for Biological Research (CIB-CSIC) (2002) where he was the head of the Chemical and Physical Biology Department. He moved to CIC bioGUNE at Bilbao in 2014, as Ikerbasque Professor and Scientific Director. He currently holds an ERC Advanced Grant (RecglycanNMR)

Positions
 Secretary General of Royal Society of Chemistry of Spain between 2004 and 2012.
 President of RSEQ between 2012 and 2018.
 Member of the editorial boards of:
 Chem. Eur. J. (2001-)
 Carbohydr. Res.(2001-)
 J. Carbohydr. Chem. (2002-)
 Org. Biomol. Chem. (2007–2008)
 Glycoconj. J.(2008-)
 Eur. J. Org. Chem. (2009-2016)
 ChemBioChem (2011-)
 ChemMedChem (2013-)
 Adv Carbohydr Chem Biochem (2013-2016)
 ACS Chem Biol (2016-)
 ACS Omega (2017-)
 Member of the European Academy of Sciences (2017)
 ChemPubSoc Fellow (2015)

 Head of the Basic Chemistry (BQU) Programme of the National Plan for Research of Spain between 2008 and 2018.

Awards
 In 2003 Janssen-Cilag Prize in Organic Chemistry of RSEQ
 In 2008 Prize of the NMR group of RSEQ.
 In 2010 Roy L. Whistler International Award in Carbohydrate Chemistry
 In 2017 Gamboa Winkler Award from the Hungarian Chemical Society 
 In 2018 Gold Medal of RSEQ

Publications
Publications

 He is co-author of more than 500 publications in international journals
 He has delivered more than 250 lectures at symposia and institutions
 He has tutored more than 25 PhD Theses and supervised more than 30 postdoctoral associates

References

External links 
 CIB
 RSEQ
 CIC bioGUNE

1960 births
Spanish chemists
Living people